Robert Ubell is the former Vice Dean of Online Learning at New York University Tandon School of Engineering, where he headed the school's e-learning unit, NYU Tandon Online, formerly known as NYU-ePoly. He is currently Vice Dean Emeritus, Online Learning at NYU Tandon Online. Under his leadership, NYU Tandon Online has grown in size and stature, achieving more than 10,000 enrollments since it was first launched. In the same year, NYU Tandon Online was the recipient of the Ralph E. Gomory Award for Quality Online Education from the Online Learning Consortium (formerly known as the Sloan Consortium)

Education
Ubell attended Brooklyn College in New York, where he earned a Bachelor of Arts in English Literature in 1961. He pursued studies in studio art, art history, and printmaking at various institutions, including Accademia di Belle Arti di Roma in Rome and Pratt Institute.

Career

Publishing Industry
Following a period of freelance journalism, publishing articles on science, health and other subjects in New York Magazine, Medical World News, and Today’s Living, among other periodicals, in 1962, he was appointed an editor of Nuclear Industry, published by the Atomic Industrial Forum. Afterwards, he rose through the ranks at Plenum Publishing Corporation, becoming Vice President and Editor-in-Chief in 1970. Subsequently, in 1974, Ubell was appointed editor of The Sciences, published by the New York Academy of Sciences. From 1979 to 1983, he served as the first American Publisher of the noted British science weekly, Nature, where he also launched Nature Biotechnology. In 1984, he founded Robert Ubell Associates, a science, technology and electronic publishing consulting firm with more than 200 clients, including major firms, such as MIT Press, Elsevier, and John Wiley & Sons, among others. From 1993-1996, he served as US president of BioMedNet, Inc., a life sciences website owned by Elsevier. Continuing his work in technical publishing, he joined Marcel Dekker in 1996 as Vice President of New Media. From 1997-1998, Ubell served on the Board of Directors of Marcel Dekker, Inc. In China, he was a member of the Board of Directors of Lianyungang Universal Vehicle Manufacturing Co., Ltd. (2006-8).

Online Education
In 1999, he joined Stevens Institute of Technology as Dean of Online Learning, where he launched WebCampus Stevens, the school's online learning unit, awarded the Sloan prize as the best online learning program in the country. During his tenure at Stevens, he also served as Dean of the School of Professional Education, where he was head of corporate training and online learning and was also responsible for the university's graduate programs in China. In 2009, Ubell joined New York University Tandon School of Engineering as vice president of the school's Enterprise Learning unit, also serving as head of the school's Online learning unit. In 2013, he was appointed Vice Dean of Online Learning. In late December 2013, Ubell was appointed to New York State's Board of Regents online learning task force. He has also served on the Board of the Online Learning Consortium & the New York State's Board of Regents online learning task force. A member of McGraw-Hill Education's Learning Science Advisory Board, he also serves on the Advisory Board of Online Learning, the journal of the Online Learning Consortium. Ubell is on the jury of the McGraw Prize.

Honors and awards
Ubell is a recipient of the A. Frank Mayadas Online Learning Leadership Award, the highest honor given to an individual in digital education. In 2011, the Online Learning Consortium (formerly known as the Sloan Consortium) named him among its 2011 Fellows and a Council Member of the Chongqing (China) International Exchange Association.

Publications and other works
Ubell is the editor of Virtual Teamwork: Mastering the Art and Practice of Online Learning and Corporate Collaboration, published in 2010. He is also the author of recently published Going Online: Perspectives on Digital Learning (2017). He served as executive editor of the Encyclopedia of Climate and Weather, Encyclopedia of Astronomy and Astrophysics, and Linguistics: The Cambridge Survey, among other scholarly reference works. The Encyclopedia of Climate and Weather was awarded the Best PSP Book (1996) by the American Association of Publishers, Professional and Scholarly Division. He is the editor of the multivolume series, Masters of Modern Physics. Papers from the series are housed at the Center for the History of Physics, Niels Bohr Library & Archives, American Institute of Physics. He is the editor of more than 26 books and the author of nearly 75 scholarly articles. He contributes an opinion column on online learning in Inside Higher Ed.

Personal life
Ubell lives in Manhattan and is married to the art historian Rosalyn Deutsche, visiting professor at Barnard College, Columbia University. He is a father of two daughters—Jennifer Hayslett, who lives in Vermont, and Elizabeth Miller who lives in Virginia. Ubell has three grandchildren, Ella Hayslett, Benjamin Hayslett, and Fordon Miller. He is the President of the Parkinson's Unity Walk, an annual fundraising event in Central Park in New York and served as Chairman of the Board of the Woodward School.

References

Brooklyn College alumni
New York University faculty
Polytechnic Institute of New York University faculty
Living people
Year of birth missing (living people)